John Alexander Logan (February 9, 1826 – December 26, 1886) was an American soldier and politician. He served in the Mexican–American War and was a general in the Union Army in the American Civil War. He served the state of Illinois as a state Representative, a U.S. Representative, and a U.S. Senator and was an unsuccessful candidate for Vice President of the United States as James G. Blaine's running mate in the election of 1884. As the 3rd Commander-in-Chief of the Grand Army of the Republic, he is regarded as the most important figure in the movement to recognize Memorial Day (originally known as Decoration Day) as an official holiday.

His likeness appears on a statue at the center of Logan Circle, Washington, D.C. He is also honored with a statue in Grant Park in Chicago, Illinois. Memorial Park in Houston, Texas was formerly Camp Logan named after him. He is the honoree of Logan County, Kansas; Logan County, Oklahoma; Logan County, Colorado; Logan County, North Dakota; and Logan Square, Chicago, which is the neighborhood chosen to mark Illinois' centennial. Logan is one of only three people mentioned by name in the Illinois state song. Upon his death, he lay in state in the United States Capitol rotunda. He is the father of U.S. Army officer and Medal of Honor recipient John Alexander Logan Jr. (1865–1899).

Early life and political career
John A. Logan was born near what is now Murphysboro, Illinois, the son of Dr. John Logan and Dr. Logan's second wife, Elizabeth (Jenkins) Logan. He studied with his father and with a private tutor, then studied for three years at Shiloh College. He enlisted in the 1st Illinois Infantry for the Mexican–American War, and received a commission as a second lieutenant and assignment as the regimental quartermaster.

After the war Logan studied law in the office of his uncle, Alexander M. Jenkins, graduated from the Law Department of the University of Louisville in 1851, and practiced law with success.

John A. Logan entered politics as a Douglas Democrat, was elected county clerk in 1849, served in the Illinois House of Representatives from 1853 to 1854 and in 1857; and for a time, during the interval, was prosecuting attorney of the Third Judicial District of Illinois. In 1858 and 1860, he was elected as a Democrat to the U.S. House of Representatives. In 1853, John A. Logan helped pass a law which prohibited all African Americans, including freedmen, from settling in the state.

Civil War

U.S. Representative Logan fought at Bull Run as an unattached volunteer in a Michigan regiment, and then returned to Washington where, before he resigned his congressional seat on April 2, 1862, he entered the Union Army as Colonel of the 31st Illinois Volunteer Infantry Regiment, which he organized. He was known by his soldiers as "Black Jack" because of his black eyes and hair and swarthy complexion, and was regarded as one of the most able officers to enter the army from civilian life.  In a time when political generals usually performed poorly in battle, Logan was an exception.

Before resigning his seat, Union Army Colonel Logan served in the army of Ulysses S. Grant in the Western Theater and was present at the Battle of Belmont on November 7, 1861, where his horse was killed, and at Fort Donelson, where he was wounded on February 15, 1862. Soon after the victory at Donelson, he resigned his seat on April 2, 1862 and was promoted to brigadier general in the volunteers, as of March 21, 1862. Major John Hotaling served as his chief of staff. To confuse matters, the 32nd Illinois was commanded at Shiloh by a different Colonel John Logan. During the Siege of Corinth, John A. Logan commanded first a brigade and then the 1st Division of the Army of the Tennessee. In the spring of 1863, he was promoted to major general to rank from November 29, 1862.

In Grant's Vicksburg Campaign, Logan commanded the 3rd Division of James B. McPherson's XVII Corps, which was the first to enter the city of Vicksburg in July 1863 after its capture. Logan then served as the city's military governor. In November 1863 he succeeded William Tecumseh Sherman in command of the XV Corps; and at the Battle of Atlanta (July 22, 1864), after the death of James B. McPherson during the day, he assumed command of the Army of the Tennessee. He was relieved a short time afterward by Oliver O. Howard. He returned to Illinois for the 1864 elections but rejoined the army afterward and commanded his XV corps in Sherman's Carolinas Campaign.

In December 1864, Grant became impatient with George H. Thomas's apparent unwillingness to attack immediately at Nashville and sent Logan to relieve him. Logan was stopped in Louisville when news came that Thomas had completely smashed John Bell Hood's Confederate army in the Battle of Nashville.

Logan had been disappointed when Howard was given permanent command of the Army of the Tennessee after McPherson's death, and Sherman arranged for Logan to lead the army during the May 1865 Grand Review in Washington.

Post-war political career

After the war, Logan resumed his political career, now as a Republican, and was a member of the United States House of Representatives from 1867 to 1871, and of the United States Senate from 1871 until 1877 and again from 1879 until his death in 1886. His re-election bid in 1885 was contentious, and Logan only won after a Democratic representative died and was replaced with a Republican. After the war, Logan, who had always been a staunch partisan, was identified with the radical wing of the Republican Party. His forceful, passionate speaking, popular on the platform, was less effective in the halls of legislation. In 1868, he was one of the House managers in the impeachment trial of U.S. President Andrew Johnson. One of Logan's issues in the Senate was his efforts to stop any action taken to overturn the conviction in the court-martial of Maj. Gen. Fitz John Porter.

He was the second Commander-in-Chief of the Grand Army of the Republic from 1868 to 1871 and helped lead the call for creation of Memorial Day, originally called Decoration Day, as a national public holiday. His war record and his great personal following, especially among members of the Grand Army of the Republic, contributed to his nomination for Vice President in 1884 on the Republican ticket with James G. Blaine, but they were defeated by the Democratic ticket of Grover Cleveland and Thomas A. Hendricks.

Logan was also a member of the Military Order of the Loyal Legion of the United States - a military society which was composed of officers who had served in the Union armed forces during the American Civil War.

Logan showed signs of illness when the 49th United States Congress opened its first official session on December 7, 1886. By mid-December, Logan's arms swelled and his lower limbs were in pain. After several days of intense discomfort, the ailment subsided. He relapsed a few days later and eventually struggled to maintain consciousness. On December 24, Logan's doctors conceded that the condition might be fatal. Around three o'clock in the afternoon on December 26, Logan died at his home in Columbia Heights, Washington, D.C. After his death, Logan's body lay in state in the United States Capitol. He was buried at the United States Soldiers' and Airmen's Home National Cemetery in Washington.

Logan was the author of two books on the Civil War. In The Great Conspiracy: Its Origin and History (1886), he sought to demonstrate that secession and the Civil War were the result of a long-contemplated "conspiracy" to which various Southern politicians had been party since the Nullification Crisis; he also vindicated the pre-war political positions of Stephen A. Douglas and himself. He also wrote The Volunteer Soldier of America (1887). His son, John Alexander Logan Jr., was also an army officer and posthumously received the Medal of Honor for actions during the Philippine–American War. His brother-in-law, Cyrus Thomas, participated in the Hayden Geological Survey of 1871.

Family
Logan was related to Cornelius Ambrosius Logan (1806–1853), the Irish-American actor and playwright, possibly as a first cousin. John Logan adopted Cornelius' daughter Kate (1847–1872), probably in 1866. Cornelius' son Cornelius Ambrose Logan, a physician and diplomat, wrote a memoir of John Logan which was included in his The Volunteer Soldier of America.

Legacy

The State of Illinois commissioned an equestrian statue of the general that now stands in Chicago's Grant Park. Another equestrian statue stands in Logan Circle in Washington, D.C., which gives its name to the surrounding neighborhood.

Logan Square, Chicago and Logan Boulevard in Chicago are named after him, as well as Logan Avenue and the neighborhood of Logan Heights (aka Barrio Logan) in San Diego, and the community of Logan Township, New Jersey. His hometown, Murphysboro, Illinois, is home to the General John A Logan Museum, as well as the General John A. Logan Elementary School; and, in nearby Carterville, Illinois, there is the John A. Logan College, a community college. Camp Logan, Illinois, an Illinois National Guard base and rifle range from 1892 to the early 1970s, was also named for him. John A. Logan Elementary School in Washington, DC is also named in his honor.

Logan is one of only three individuals mentioned by name in the Illinois state song:

 Logan County, Illinois, was named after Logan's father, Dr. John Logan, an early pioneer physician. However, Logan County, Kansas was named after General Logan.
 Logan was at one time honored with the naming of a street in Lansing, Michigan. Community activists persuaded the city council to co-rename the street as Martin Luther King Boulevard in 1991. Logan's name was dropped completely a few years later. See Capitol Loop#Street name changes
 Logan County, Oklahoma, is named in his honor. The city of Guthrie is the county seat.
 Logan County, Colorado, is named in his honor. The city of Sterling is the county seat.
 Logan County, North Dakota, is named in his honor. The city of Napoleon is the county seat.
 John A. Logan College in Carterville, Illinois is named in his honor.
 Logan Junior High School in Princeton, Illinois is named in his honor.
 Logan High School in La Crosse, Wisconsin is named in his honor.
 The Logan House in Wilmington, Delaware is the oldest Irish Pub in the state and named in his honor.
 Ft. Logan National Cemetery established 1887 in Denver, Colorado is name after him.
 Logan's final resting place at the U.S. Soldiers' and Airmen's Home National Cemetery is a granite, Norman-style mausoleum, design by the former supervising architect of the U.S. Treasury Department, Alfred B. Mullett, which houses the remains of General John A. Logan; his wife, Mary S. Logan; daughter, Mary Logan Tucker; and grandsons, Captain Logan Tucker and George E. Tucker.

Publications about Logan

See also
 List of American Civil War generals (Union)
 List of Grand Army of the Republic Commanders-in-Chief
 List of United States Congress members who died in office (1790–1899)

Notes

References
 Cottingham, Carl D., Preston Michael Jones, and Gary W. Kent, General John A. Logan: His Life and Times, American Resources Group, 1989, .
 Eicher, John H., and David J. Eicher, Civil War High Commands, Stanford University Press, 2001, .
 Jones, James Pickett. John A. Logan and Southern Illinois in the Civil War Era. 1967. .
 Logan, Mrs. John A., Reminiscences of a Soldier's Wife, Kessinger, 2007, .
 Warner, Ezra J., Generals in Blue: Lives of the Union Commanders, Louisiana State University Press, 1964, .

External links

 
 
 
 
 U.S. Memorial Day Association
 Portrait of A Hero in Blue, Major Genernal John A. Logan
 The volunteer soldier of America by John A. Logan

|-

|-

|-

|-

|-

|-

|-

|-

|-

1826 births
1886 deaths
19th-century American politicians
American lawyers admitted to the practice of law by reading law
American military personnel of the Mexican–American War
Burials at United States Soldiers' and Airmen's Home National Cemetery
Democratic Party members of the United States House of Representatives from Illinois
Grand Army of the Republic Commanders-in-Chief
Illinois lawyers
Members of the Illinois House of Representatives
People from Murphysboro, Illinois
People of Illinois in the American Civil War
Republican Party (United States) vice presidential nominees
Republican Party members of the United States House of Representatives from Illinois
Republican Party United States senators from Illinois
Union Army generals
1884 United States vice-presidential candidates
University of Louisville alumni
Stalwarts (Republican Party)